Neocussonia vantsilana is a species of flowering plant endemic to Madagascar.

References

Araliaceae
Endemic flora of Madagascar